Roland Nilsson (born 13 September 1948) is a Swedish racewalker. He competed in the men's 50 kilometres walk at the 1984 Summer Olympics.

References

1948 births
Living people
Athletes (track and field) at the 1984 Summer Olympics
Swedish male racewalkers
Olympic athletes of Sweden
Place of birth missing (living people)